Arctosa excellens is a wolf spider species found in Portugal and Spain.

See also 
 List of Lycosidae species

References

External links 

excellens
Spiders of Europe
Spiders described in 1876